Des Champ (9 July 1928 – 7 June 2006 in London, England) was a musician, bandleader, producer, and arranger.

In a musical career lasting over 35 years, Des gained notoriety in the British music business for his ground-breaking production and arrangement work in collaboration with partner Roger Easterby. Des first achieved chart success with Vanity Fare, whose "Hitchin' a Ride" sold a million copies in the US alone, but his most notable pop achievement was with glam-rock band Chicory Tip, whose "Son of My Father" featured a Moog synthesizer (a relatively obscure instrument at the time). "Son of My Father" went on to top the UK pop music charts for three weeks in early 1972 and was a seminal influence on 80s synthesizer bands like ABC. Later in his career, Des worked as musical director for Shirley Bassey, 5000 Volts, and Tony Monopoly, before finally taking a regular day job with the Orchestration Department at BBC Radio Two.

He died of cancer on 7 June 2006 in London.

Discography

External links 
 Des Champ discography at Discogs
 Shirley and Johnny website
 The Bedside Bond Album

1928 births
English record producers
2006 deaths
20th-century British businesspeople